Branson is an English surname. Notable people with the surname include:

 Brad Branson (born 1958), American professional basketball player
 Catherine Branson (born 1948), Australian human rights commissioner
 Clive Branson (1907–44), British artist and poet
 David Branson (1963–2001), Australian theatre director
 Don Branson (1920–66), American racecar driver
 Edith Branson (1891–1976), American painter 
 Edward Branson, American geologist and paleontologist
 Frederick Woodward Branson (1851–1933), British chemist, glassblower, instrument maker and X-ray pioneer
 G. A. H. Branson (1871–1951), judge of the High Court of England and Wales
 George Branson (1918–1999), Australian politician
 Herman Branson  (1914–1995), African-American physicist
 Jeff Branson (born 1977), American actor
 Jeff Branson (baseball player) (born 1967), American Major League baseball player
 Jesse Branson (born 1942), American basketball player
 Noreen Branson (1910–2003), British Communist activist
 Richard Branson (born 1950), British entrepreneur
 Tony Branson (born 1947), Australian rugby league footballer
 Vernon Mostyn Branson (1908–1992), Australian author and publisher
 William Henry Branson (1887–1961), American Seventh-day Adventist

English-language surnames